Gordon W. Davis College of Agricultural Sciences & Natural Resources is a college at Texas Tech University in Lubbock, Texas. The agriculture program has existed at Texas Tech since 1925 making it one of the original programs at the university. The college currently contains six departments that offer fourteen baccalaureate, twenty master's, and eight Ph.D. degrees. It also ranks in the top third in terms of size among universities with agricultural science and natural resources colleges placing it among the top 30 largest programs.

The college was renamed in 2022 following a $44 million donation by Gordon and Joyce Davis, the single largest philanthropic donation to Texas Tech. Gordon Davis had served as an associate professor for 10 years in the college, and in 1989 led Texas Tech to the university's first of 16 national championships in meat judging.

Academic departments 
 Agricultural and Applied Economics
 Agricultural Education and Communications
 Animal and Food Sciences
 Landscape Architecture
 Plant and Soil Science
 Natural Resources Management

Research centers 

 College of Agricultural Sciences & Natural Resource Water Center
 Center for Agricultural Technology Transfer
 Center for Feed and Industry Research and Education
 Cotton Economics Research Institute
 Fire Ecology Center
 International Center for Food Industry Excellence
 International Cotton Research Center
 International Textile Center
 Pork Industry Institute for Research and Education
 Thornton Agricultural Finance Institute
 Texas Cooperative Research Unit
 Wildlife and Fisheries Management Institute

Notable people

Former students

Faculty

References

External links
 

Agricultural universities and colleges in the United States
Educational institutions established in 1925
Agricultural Sciences and Natural Resources
1925 establishments in Texas